Tishomingo Hotel in Corinth, Mississippi was a hotel built in 1859, used as a military hospital during the American Civil War. It was burned down by Confederate forces in 1865.  

The two-story hotel was built in 1859 by Swiss architect Martin Siegrist. The hotel had a prime location, close to the railroad depot. In the backyard stood the hotel kitchen in a separate building, as well as a number of outbuildings. 

During the war it became a  military hospital of both contending armies. First as a Confederate hospital after the Battle of Shiloh in April 1862, and then as a Union hospital after Battle of Corinth in October the same year. It was later used as a shelter for escaped slaves. 

In 1865 Corinth briefly fell into Confederate hands again, and the hotel was used as a supply magazine. When leaving town, the Confederate army under John B. Hood burned the hotel, in order to prevent the Union army from taking control over the supplies.

References

1859 in Mississippi
1865 in Mississippi
Buildings and structures in Alcorn County, Mississippi
Mississippi in the American Civil War
Hotel buildings completed in 1859
Buildings and structures demolished in 1865
Demolished buildings and structures in Mississippi